Wellness in the Schools is a nonprofit organization that promotes healthy eating, environmental awareness and fitness for children in New York City public schools. It is led by volunteer chef Bill Telepan, a Manhattan restaurateur.

The organization runs three programs: Cook for Kids, which recruits culinary school graduates to work with cafeteria workers to provide fresh meals for children; Green for Kids, which promotes the use of environmentally safe cleaning products in schools; and Coach for Kids, which trains coaches to encourage children to participate in physical activities and reduce playground bullying.

References

External links 
 

Health campaigns
Public education in New York City
New York City Department of Education
Charities based in New York (state)